Robbie Guertin is a former keyboardist/guitarist/backup vocalist for the indie rock band Clap Your Hands Say Yeah and a drummer/vocalist for the band Radical Dads.

History

Robbie grew up in Belmont, Massachusetts and went to Belmont High School. He attended college at Connecticut College along with the other members of Clap Your Hands Say Yeah prior to the group's formation where he studied art. Robbie is featured in The Warhol Economy: How Fashion Art & Music Drive New York City  in regards to Clap Your Hands Say Yeah.

Robbie was also the primary art director and often the artist for all of Clap Your Hands Say Yeah's album and single covers, as well as several concert posters. The first album's artwork was a collaboration with artist Dasha Shishkin.

On July 3, 2012 Guertin publicly announced that after a final show in New York City on July 7, he would no longer be a member of Clap Your Hands Say Yeah.

Robbie and Dasha Shishkin also collaborated to create BB&PPINC.  They were one of the artists featured in By Hand: The Use of Craft in Contemporary Art. BB&PPINC had a solo exhibition and book release party at About Glamour Gallery in Brooklyn
.

Robbie was also in the band Uninhabitable Mansions which also  featured Tyler Sargent from Clap Your Hands Say Yeah along with Annie Hart from Au Revoir Simone, along with Chris Diken.  Uninhabitable Mansions is also an art collective and record label.

Robbie currently plays drums and sings in the band Radical Dads

Discography

with Clap Your Hands Say Yeah
2005: Clap Your Hands Say Yeah
2007: Some Loud Thunder
2007: Live at Lollapalooza 2007: Clap Your Hands Say Yeah
2011: Hysterical

with Uninhabitable Mansions
2009: "We Misplaced a Cobra in the Uninhabitable Mansion" 7-inch single
2009: 'Nature is a Taker" LP

with Radical Dads
2010: "Recklessness" 7-inch single
2011: 'Mega Rama" LP
2011: "Skateboard Bulldog" 7-inch single
2012: "Torrential Zen" 7-inch split single
2013: 'Rapid Reality" LP
2013: "Creature Out" 7-inch single
2014: "Cassette Brain" Cassette Tape EP
2015: "Universal Coolers" LP
2020: "Paved Mountain" LP

References

External links 
 Radical Dads website
 Uninhabitable Mansions website
 BB&PPINC website
 Clap Your Hands Say Yeah website

American male singers
American rock guitarists
American male guitarists
Connecticut College alumni
Living people
Year of birth missing (living people)
Belmont High School (Massachusetts) alumni